Shivapuri Nagarjun National Park is the ninth national park in Nepal and was established in 2002. It is located in the country's mid-hills on the northern fringe of the Kathmandu Valley and named after Shivapuri Peak of  altitude. In the west, the protected area extends to the Dhading District.

History
The area has always been an important water catchment area, supplying the Kathmandu Valley with several hundred thousands cubic liter of water daily. In 1976, the area was established as a protected watershed and wildlife reserve. In 2002, it was gazetted as Shivapuri National Park, initially covering . It was extended by the Nagarjun Forest Reserve covering  in 2009.

The park includes some historical and religious sites, and a popular hiking route for local people and tourists.

Climate
The park is located in a transition zone between subtropical and temperate climate. The annual precipitation of about  falls mostly from May to September, with 80% during monsoon. Temperatures vary from  during the winter season, rising to  during the summer season.

Vegetation

 Himalayan subtropical broadleaf forests in the lower and upper subtropical bioclimatic zone dominated by Schima-Castanopsis associations, with chir pine stands on southern dry ridges and associations of alder, wild Himalayan cherry, Engelhardia and ring-cupped oak along streams;
 Eastern Himalayan broadleaf forests in the lower temperate bioclimatic zone with predominantly broadleaf evergreen species of oak and laurel families mixed with rhododendron on northern slopes.
In higher elevations, a variety of medicinal herbs prosper. Botanists have recorded 129 species of mushrooms and 2,122 floral species, out of which 449 are vascular and 16 are endemic plants.

Fauna

Since 2002 several surveys have been carried out to determine the faunal diversity of the protected area. In a field study carried out from July 2003 to July 2004, Indian leopard, jungle cat, large Indian civet, golden jackal, Himalayan black bear, yellow-throated marten, small Indian mongoose, Himalayan goral, Indian muntjac, wild boar, rhesus monkey, Hanuman langur, Chinese pangolin, Indian crested porcupine, Royle's pika, Indian hare, orange-bellied Himalayan squirrel, fawn-colored mouse, Hodgsons's brown-toothed shrew and black rat were identified. Clouded leopard,  leopard cat, masked palm civet, crab-eating mongoose, Indian pangolin, rhesus macaque and yellow-throated marten, were photographed by camera traps in 2010.

In the western part of the park, herpetologists encountered monocled cobra, Himalayan keelback, olive Oriental slender snake, yellow-bellied worm-eating snake, variegated mountain lizard, Oriental garden lizard, many-keeled grass skink, Sikkim skink, black-spined toad, long-legged cricket frog and horned frog in the summer of 2009.

Ornithologists recorded 318 species of birds including Eurasian eagle-owl, slender-billed scimitar-babbler, white-gorgeted flycatcher, barred cuckoo-dove and golden-throated barbet.

References

Further reading
 Bird Conservation Nepal (2006). Birds of Shivapuri. Checklist of 318 reported species. Published in cooperation with Shivapuri National Park, Kathmandu.

External links
 Department of National Parks and Wildlife Conservation, Nepal : Shivapuri Nagarjun National Park
 BirdLife IBA factsheet about Shivapuri Nagarjun National Park

Eastern Himalayan broadleaf forests
National parks of Nepal
2002 establishments in Nepal